Muirend railway station is an island platform suburban railway station in the Muirend area of Glasgow, Scotland. The station, which opened in 1903, is managed by ScotRail and lies on the  branch of the Cathcart Circle Lines.

History 
Though the line carried freight and express boat trains from Adrossan to Glasgow Central, Muirend was only ever served by local suburban workings. A connection was laid in south of the station down to the Busby Railway at  around the same time as the L&AR main line was opened, but it was never used for through traffic (only for wagon storage) and was disconnected by 1907 (though the brick viaduct it used still stands to this day), and only the crossover underneath the road bridge immediately south of the station remains of the kilometre long branch. Through passenger traffic over this route declined significantly after the 1923 Grouping and regular passenger trains were withdrawn beyond  in 1932.

Services through here were converted to diesel operation from 1958 and the Cathcart lines were subsequently electrified in 1962 (though the wires only ran as far as Neilston, the line beyond closing to passengers in April 1962 and completely in December 1964). With popular demand, these services were reinstated in the 1980s. With electrification came the Class 303 'Blue Train' EMUs, which operated the Cathcart Circle and its branches until their withdrawal in the early 2000s. Class 314 EMUs cascaded from the Inverclyde routes by the introduction of the Class 334 Juniper EMUs took over workings, and were only replaced on the route a couple of months before their final withdrawal in December 2019.

The proposals were not well received and were never implemented.

Services and facilities 

Services are now operated mainly by 4 car Class 380/1 EMUs, with the 3 coach Class 318 EMUs and Class 320 EMUs working together to provide 6 coach services at peak times. Two trains an hour operate in each direction calling all stops from Glasgow Central to Neilston. Additionally, additional peak time services operate between Central and Neilston, calling only from Muirend through to the terminus. Sunday services are also half hourly, but start around 3 hours later than on other days.

The station has an island platform with a ramp providing access directly to the platform from Muirend Road at the south end of the station. At the north end, there is footbridge access to and from Hillcrest Avenue and Cairndow Court. The station building (which is a Category B listed building) contains a ticket office which is staffed on a part-time basis. An automated ticket machine is present.

References

Notes

Sources

External links

Railway stations in Glasgow
Former Caledonian Railway stations
Railway stations in Great Britain opened in 1903
SPT railway stations
Railway stations served by ScotRail
Listed railway stations in Scotland
Category B listed buildings in Glasgow